Tillandsia chiapensis is a species of flowering plant in the genus Tillandsia. This species is endemic to Mexico.

Cultivars
 Tillandsia 'Madre'
 Tillandsia 'Majestic'
 Tillandsia 'Padre'
 Tillandsia 'Silver Trinket'
 Tillandsia 'Silverado'

References

BSI Cultivar Registry Retrieved 11 October 2009

chiapensis
Endemic flora of Mexico
Plants described in 1978